Korabl-Sputnik 1 ( meaning Vessel Satellite 1), also known as Sputnik 4 in the West, was the first test flight of the Soviet Vostok programme, and the first Vostok spacecraft. It was launched on May 15, 1960. Though Korabl-Sputnik 1 was uncrewed, it was a precursor to the first human spaceflight, Vostok 1.

The spacecraft, the first of a series of spacecraft used to investigate the means for crewed space flight, contained scientific instruments, a television system, and a self-sustaining biological cabin with a dummy of a man. It was designed to study the operation of the life support system and the stresses of flight. The spacecraft radioed both extensive telemetry and prerecorded voice communications. After four days of flight, the retro rocket was fired and the descent module was separated from its equipment module, but because the spacecraft was not in the correct flight attitude when its retro fired, the descent module did not reenter the atmosphere as planned. 

The descent module re-entered the atmosphere on September 5, 1962, while the equipment module re-entered on October 15, 1965. A 20-pound piece of the descent module landed in Manitowoc, Wisconsin in the northern United States.

Giovanni Battista Judica Cordiglia, who set up his own amateur listening station at Torre Bert near Turin, is reported to have claimed that radio signals were received on November 28, 1960, which could have originated from this spacecraft; the spacecraft is known to have radioed prerecorded voice communications. It has led some to believe a conspiracy theory that the spacecraft may have been crewed by the Lost Cosmonauts.

Notes

References

May 1960 events
1960 in the Soviet Union
Spacecraft launched in 1960
Spacecraft which reentered in 1962

Korabl Sputnik 1